MegaTech (sometimes styled with the katakana メガテケ) was a publication from EMAP aimed specifically at the Sega Mega Drive gaming market. The magazine was started in 1991. The launch editorial consisted of a small team including Paul Glancey (editor) and Mark Patterson (deputy editor). It was published monthly. In 1993 the magazine was acquired by Maverick Magazines. It ceased publication in 1994 when it was merged into Mega magazine.

Founding editor Paul Glancey spoke about the magazine's difficult launch, evolution and eventual closure, in a 2022 retrospective article, The MegaTech story: An oral history.

References

External links
 Archived MegaTech magazines on the Internet Archive
 The MegaTech story: An oral history by Paul Glancey

1991 establishments in the United Kingdom
Monthly magazines published in the United Kingdom
Video game magazines published in the United Kingdom
Defunct computer magazines published in the United Kingdom
Magazines established in 1991
Magazines disestablished in 1994
Sega magazines
Sega Genesis